SSB may refer to:

Organizations
 Scandinavian School of Brussels
 Social Security Board (disambiguation)
 , the Society of Saint Bridget
 Society of the Sisters of Bethany, an Anglican order of sisters
 Society of Systematic Biologists
 , a former public transport operator in Switzerland
 Statistics Norway, a Norwegian government statistics bureau
 , a public transport operator in Germany
 Sustainable South Bronx, an environmental justice organization
 Swedish School Beijing, a former international school in China (1994–2015)
 Smoke Signal Broadcasting, a defunct American computer company

Military
 Presidency of Defense Industries of Turkey
 , an Indian paramilitary force, formerly called Special Service Bureau
 Secret Service Bureau, of the United Kingdom, now called the Secret Intelligence Service
 Services Selection Board, for the selection of candidates in officer cadre of Indian Armed Forces
 Special Service Battalion, a South African military unit
 Strategic Support Branch, a U.S Department of Defense intelligence agency

Science and technology
 Secure Scuttlebutt
 Single-sideband modulation, in radio technology
 Single-stranded binding protein
 Single-strand break, a break in only one of the two strands on DNA
 Site-specific browser, for an intranet or the Internet
 Sjogren syndrome antigen B, a human gene
 Speculative Store Bypass, a hardware security flaw affecting many processors
 Spontaneous symmetry breaking, in physics
 Stabilized soil block, a type of compressed earth block, a building material

Entertainment
 Sonic Soldier Borgman, a Japanese animated television series
 Super Smash Bros., a platform fighting game series featuring characters from Nintendo and third-party franchises
 Super Smash Bros. (video game), the first game in the series
 Swet Shop Boys, a hip hop group

Other uses
 Ship Submersible Ballistic, a submarine
 Standard Southern British, a name for a variety of English
 Sugar-Sweetened Beverage, a formal term for soda